Arrhenophanes perspicilla is a species of moth in the family Arrhenophanidae. It occurs throughout much of the lowland Neotropical Region from the state of Veracruz in Mexico to Misiones in Argentina and Rio Grande do Sul in southern Brazil. It is absent from the West Indies.

The length of the forewings is 13–21 mm for males and 19–32 mm for females. In favorable habitats, adults of this species can be encountered throughout the year. In the lowlands of Costa Rica, for example, adults have been collected in every month of the year.

The larvae feed on Polyporus species, including Polyporus vulgaris.

Larvae
The length of the larvae ranges up to 41 mm with a maximum width of 10 mm. They are cuticle white, with yellowish brown to black plates and spots.

Larval Case
The larval case has a length of up to 40 mm and a maximum width of 16 mm wide. It is slightly depressed with thick, tough walls which are lined internally with dense, white silk. It is covered externally with brownish, matted silk and fungal fragments.

Pupa
The pupa has a maximum length of 22 mm for females and 17 mm for males. The female antennal sheaths are more than 2 times the width of those of the male.

External links
Family Arrhenophanidae

Arrhenophanidae
Moths described in 1790